Evgeny Donskoy was the defending champion, but lost to Illya Marchenko in the quarterfinals.

Andrey Golubev won the title, defeating Andrey Kuznetsov in the final, 6–4, 6–3.

Seeds

Draw

Finals

Top half

Bottom half

References
 Main Draw
 Qualifying Draw

Siberia Cup - Singles
2013 Singles
Siberia Cup - Singles